Mount Hulda is an unincorporated community in Benton County, in the U.S. state of Missouri.

History
An early variant name was Hulda.  A post office called Hulda was established in 1904, the name was changed to Mount Hulda in 1916, and the post office closed in 1924. The origin of the name Mount Hulda is obscure.

References

Unincorporated communities in Benton County, Missouri
Unincorporated communities in Missouri